Stella Zázvorková (14 April 1922 – 18 May 2005) was a Czech actress from Prague.

Zázvorková, an alumnus of Prague's theatre school of E.F. Burian, appeared in more than a hundred films and series. She was married to the actor Miloš Kopecký. She became known abroad through series including Arabela, The Territory of White Deer, and Hospital at the End of the City, and also through her role in the Oscar-winning movie Kolya by Jan Svěrák.

Filmography

External links 
 
 Stella Zázvorková within TSFSI (in German)

1922 births
2005 deaths
Czech film actresses
Czech stage actresses
Czech television actresses
Recipients of Medal of Merit (Czech Republic)
Actresses from Prague
20th-century Czech actresses
21st-century Czech actresses
Czechoslovak actresses
Recipients of the Thalia Award